St. Joseph is a Roman Catholic church located in Maxvorstadt, Munich, Bavaria, Germany. 

Buildings and structures in Munich
Maxvorstadt
Franciscan churches in Germany